The 2019 Rhythmic Gymnastics Junior World Championships were the inaugural Rhythmic Gymnastics Junior World Championships. They were held in Moscow, Russia, from 19 July to 21 July 2019.

Following the success of the event, which was measured by the amount of participating nations, The Executive Committee of the International Gymnastics Federation has announced the addition of the junior competitions to the official sporting calendar, which will take place every two years, in odd years. The next competition was going to be held in 2021, the covid-19 pandemic has postponed it to 2023.

Participating nations

  (8)
  (7)
  (7)
  (7)
  (2)
  (9)
  (2)
  (10)
  (9)
  (8)
  (1)
  (3)
  (1)
  (2)
  (2)
  (1)
  (9)
  (9)
  (7)
  (8)
  (3)
  (2)
  (7)
  (7)
  (9)
  (2)
  (9)
  (1)
  (9)
  (7)
  (7)
  (7)
  (4)
  (4)
  (4)
  (3)
  (7)
  (9)
  (8)
  (3)
  (9)
  (2)
  (8)
  (2)
  (2)
  (8)
  (2)
  (2)
  (7)
  (1)
  (10)
  (8)
  (1)
  (2)
  (1)
  (7)
  (1)
  (3)
  (7)
  (8)
  (7)

Medal winners

Individual

Team

Rope

Ball

Clubs

Ribbon

Group

All-Around 
The top 8 scores in the apparatus qualifies to the group apparatus finals.

5 Hoops

5 Ribbons

Medal table

References

External links
 

Rhythmic Gymnastics World Championships
Junior World Gymnastics Championships
International gymnastics competitions hosted by Russia
World Rhythmic Gymnastics Championships
World Rhythmic Gymnastics Championships
Sports competitions in Moscow
Junior World Rhythmic Gymnastics